Stephen Fain Earle (born January 17, 1955) is an American singer-songwriter, record producer, author, and actor. Earle began his career as a songwriter in Nashville and released his first EP in 1982. Initially working in the country music genre, Earle branched out into multiple genres of rock music, bluegrass, folk music and blues.

His breakthrough album was the 1986 debut album Guitar Town; the eponymous lead single peaked at number 7 on the Billboard Hot Country chart. Since then Earle has released 20 more studio albums and received three Grammy awards each for Best Contemporary Folk Album; he has four additional nominations in the same category. "Copperhead Road" was released in 1988 and is his best selling single; it peaked on its initial release at number 10 on the Mainstream Rock chart, and had a 21st century resurgence reaching number 15 on the Hot Rock & Alternative Songs chart, buoyed by vigorous online sales. His songs have been recorded by Johnny Cash, Waylon Jennings, Willie Nelson, Levon Helm, The Highwaymen, Travis Tritt, Vince Gill, Patty Loveless, Shawn Colvin, Bob Seger, Percy Sledge, and Emmylou Harris. He has appeared in film and television, most notably as recurring characters in HBO's critically acclaimed shows The Wire and Treme. He has also written a novel, a play, and a book of short stories.

Earle is the father of the late singer-songwriter Justin Townes Earle whom he often collaborated with.

Early life
Earle was born in Fort Monroe, Virginia, where his father was stationed as an air traffic controller. The family moved to Texas before Earle's second birthday and he grew up primarily in the San Antonio area.

Earle began learning the guitar at the age of 11 and entered a school talent contest at age 13. He ran away from home at age 14 to search for his idol, singer-songwriter Townes Van Zandt. Earle was "rebellious" as a young man and dropped out of school at the age of 16. He moved to Houston with his 19-year-old uncle, also a musician. While in Houston Earle finally met Van Zandt. Earle was opposed to the Vietnam war as he recalled in 2012: "The anti-war movement was a very personal thing for me. I didn't finish high school, so I wasn't a candidate for a student deferment. I was fucking going." The end of the Selective Service Act and the draft lottery in 1973 prevented him from being drafted, but several of his friends were drafted, which he credits as the origin of his politicization. Earle also noted that when he was a young man, his girlfriend was able to get an abortion despite the fact that abortion was illegal. Her father was a doctor at the local hospital in San Antonio while several other girls he knew at the time were not able to get abortions; they lacked access to those with the necessary power to arrange an abortion, which he credits as the origin of his pro-choice views.

Career

1974 to 1999
In 1974, at the age of 19 Earle moved to Nashville and began working blue-collar jobs during the day and playing music at night. During this period Earle wrote songs and played bass guitar in Guy Clark's band and sang on Clark's 1975 album Old No. 1. Earle appeared in the 1976 film Heartworn Highways, a documentary on the Nashville music scene which included David Allan Coe, Guy Clark, Townes van Zandt, and Rodney Crowell. Earle lived in Nashville for several years and assumed the position of staff songwriter at the publishing company Sunbury Dunbar. Later Earle grew tired of Nashville and returned to Texas where he started a band called The Dukes.

In the 1980s, Earle returned to Nashville once again and worked as a songwriter for the publishers Roy Dea and Pat Carter. A song he co-wrote, "When You Fall in Love", was recorded by Johnny Lee and made number 14 on the country charts in 1982. Carl Perkins recorded Earle's song "Mustang Wine", and two of his songs were recorded by Zella Lehr. Later Dea and Carter created an independent record label called LSI and invited Earle to begin recording his own material on their label. Connie Smith recorded Earle's composition "A Far Cry from You" in 1985 which reached a minor position on the country charts as well.

Earle released an EP called, Pink & Black, in 1982 featuring the Dukes. Acting as Earle's manager, John Lomax sent the EP to Epic Records, and they signed Earle to a recording contract in 1983. In 1983, Earle signed a record deal with CBS and recorded a "neo-rockabilly album".

After losing his publishing contract with Dea and Carter, Earle met producer Tony Brown and after severing his ties with Lomax and Epic Records obtained a seven-record deal with MCA Records. Earle released his first full-length album, Guitar Town, on MCA Records in 1986. The title track became a Top Ten single in 1986 and his song "Goodbye's All We've Got Left" reached the Top Ten in 1987. That same year he released a compilation of earlier recordings, entitled Early Tracks, and an album with the Dukes, called Exit 0, which "received critical acclaim" for its blend of country and rock.

Earle released Copperhead Road on Uni Records in 1988 which was characterized as "a quixotic project that mixed a lyrical folk tradition with hard rock and eclectic Irish influences such as The Pogues, who guested on the record". The album's title track portrays a Vietnam veteran who uses his family background in running moonshine to become a marijuana grower/seller. It was Earle's highest-peaking song to date in the United States and has sold 1.1 million digital copies there as of September 2017. Then Earle began "three years in a mysterious vaporization" according to the Chicago Sun-Times.

His 1990 album The Hard Way had a strong rock sound and was followed by "a shoddy live album" called Shut Up and Die Like an Aviator. In August 1991, Earle appeared on the TV show The Texas Connection "looking pale and blown out". In light of Earle's "increasing drug use", MCA Records did not renew his contract and Earle didn't record any music for the next four years. By July 1993 Earle was reported to have regained his normal weight and had started to write new material. At that time a writer for the Chicago Sun-Times called Earle "a visionary symbol of the New Traditionalist movement in country music."

In 1994, two staff members at Warner/Chappell publishing company and Earle's former manager, John Dotson, created an in-house CD of Earle's songs entitled Uncut Gems and showcased it to some recording artists in Nashville. This resulted in several of Earle's songs being recorded by Travis Tritt, Stacy Dean Campbell and Robert Earl Keen. After his recording hiatus, Earle released Train a Comin' on Winter Harvest Records and it was nominated for the Grammy Award for Best Contemporary Folk Album in 1996. The album was characterized as a return to the "folksy acoustic" sound of his early career.

In 1996, Earle formed his own record label, E-Squared Records, and released the album I Feel Alright, which combined the musical sounds of country, rock and rockabilly. Earle released the album El Corazon (The Heart) in 1997 which one reviewer called "the capstone of this [Earle's] remarkable comeback".

According to Earle, he wrote the song "Over Yonder" about a death row inmate with whom he exchanged letters before attending his execution in 1998. He made a foray into bluegrass influenced music in 1999 when he released the album The Mountain with the Del McCoury Band. In 2000, Earle recorded his album Transcendental Blues, which features the song "Galway Girl".

2000 to present
Earle presented excerpts of his poetry and fiction writing at the 2000 New Yorker Festival. His novel, I'll Never Get Out of This World Alive, was published in the spring of 2011 and a collection of short stories called Doghouse Roses followed that June. Earle wrote and produced an off-Broadway play about the death of Karla Faye Tucker, the first woman executed since the death penalty was reinstated in Texas.

In the early 2000s, Earle's album Jerusalem expressed his anti-war, anti-death penalty and his other "leftist views". The album's song "John Walker's Blues", about the captured American Taliban fighter John Walker Lindh created controversy. Earle responded by appearing on a variety of news and editorial programs and defended the song and his views on patriotism and terrorism. His subsequent tour featured the Jerusalem album and was released as the live album Just an American Boy in 2003.

In 2004, Earle released the album The Revolution Starts Now, a collection of songs influenced by the Iraq War and the policies of the George W. Bush administration and won a Grammy for best contemporary folk album. The title song was used by General Motors in a TV advertisement. The album was released during the U.S. presidential campaign.

The song "The Revolution Starts Now" was used in the promotional materials for Michael Moore's anti-war documentary film Fahrenheit 9/11 and appears on the album Songs and Artists That Inspired Fahrenheit 9/11. That year Earle was the subject of a documentary DVD called Just an American Boy.

In 2006, Earle contributed a cover of Randy Newman's song "Rednecks" to the tribute album Sail Away: The Songs of Randy Newman. Earle hosted a radio show on Air America from August 2004 until June 2007. Later he began hosting a show called Hardcore Troubadour on the Outlaw Country channel. Earle is also the subject of two biographies, Steve Earle: Fearless Heart, Outlaw Poet, by David McGee and Hardcore Troubadour: The Life and Near Death of Steve Earle by Lauren St John.

In September 2007, Earle released his twelfth studio album, Washington Square Serenade, on New West Records. Earle recorded the album after relocating to New York City, and was his first use of digital audio recording. The album features Earle's then-wife, Allison Moorer, on "Days Aren't Long Enough" and "Down Here Below." The album includes Earle's version of Tom Waits' song "Way Down in the Hole" which was the theme song for the fifth season of the HBO series The Wire in which Earle appeared as a recovering drug addict and drug counselor named Walon (Earle's character appears in the first, fourth, and fifth seasons). In 2008, Earle produced Joan Baez's album Day After Tomorrow. Prior to their collaboration on Day After Tomorrow, Baez had covered two Earle songs, "Christmas in Washington" and "Jerusalem", on previous albums; "Jerusalem" had also become a staple of Baez' concerts. In the winter, he toured Europe and North America in support of Washington Square Serenade, performing both solo and with a disc jockey.

On May 12, 2009, Earle released a tribute album, Townes, on New West Records. The album contained 15 songs written by Townes Van Zandt. Guest artists appearing on the album included Tom Morello of Rage Against the Machine, Moorer, and his son Justin. The album earned Earle a third Grammy award, again for best contemporary folk album.

In 2010, Earle was awarded the National Coalition to Abolish the Death Penalty's Shining Star of Abolition award. Earle has recorded two other anti-death penalty songs: "Billy Austin", and "Ellis Unit One" for the 1995 film Dead Man Walking.

In 2010–2011, Earle appeared in seasons 1 and 2 of the HBO show Treme as Harley Wyatt, a talented street musician who mentors another character.

Earle released his first novel and fourteenth studio album, both titled I'll Never Get Out of This World Alive after a Hank Williams song, in the spring of 2011. The album was produced by T Bone Burnett and deals with questions of mortality with a "more country" sound than his earlier work. During the second half of his 2011 tour with The Dukes and Duchesses and Moorer, the drum kit was adorned with the slogan "we are the 99%" a reference to the Occupy movement of September 2011.

On February 17, 2015, Earle released his sixteenth studio album, Terraplane.

On September 10, 2015, Earle & the Dukes released a new internet single titled "Mississippi, It's Time". The song's lyrics are directed towards the state of Mississippi and their refusal to abandon the Confederate Flag and remove it from their state flag. The song was released for sale the following day with all proceeds going towards the Southern Poverty Law Center, a civil rights organization.

On June 10, 2016, Earle released an album of duets with Shawn Colvin, titled simply Colvin And Earle, which was accompanied by a tour in London and the US.

On June 16, 2017, Earle & the Dukes released his seventeenth studio album, So You Wannabe An Outlaw. GUY, Earle's tribute album to his songwriting hero Guy Clark was released on March 29, 2019.

Earle was among hundreds of artists whose material was destroyed in the 2008 Universal fire. Earle was one of five artists who filed a class action lawsuit against Universal on June 21, in response to an earlier Times report on the fire.

In June 2021 Earle joined Willie Nile on Nile's new song "Blood on Your Hands" to be featured on Nile's upcoming album The Day the Earth Stood Still.

Personal life
Earle has been married seven times, including twice to the same woman. He married Sandra "Sandy" Henderson in Houston at the age of 18, but left her to move to Nashville a year later where he met and married his second wife, Cynthia Dunn. Earle married his third wife, Carol-Ann Hunter, who is the mother of their late son, singer-songwriter Justin Townes Earle (1982–2020).

Next, he married Lou-Anne Gill (with whom he had a second son, Ian Dublin Earle, in January 1987) and then his fifth wife, Teresa Ensenat, who was an A&R executive for Geffen Records at the time. He then married Lou-Anne Gill a second time, and finally, in 2005, he married singer-songwriter Allison Moorer with whom he had a third son, John Henry Earle, in April 2010. John Henry was diagnosed with autism before age two. In March 2014, Earle announced that he and Moorer had separated.

In 1993, Earle was arrested for possession of heroin and in 1994, for cocaine and weapons possession. A judge sentenced him to a year in jail after he admitted possession and failed to appear in court. He was released from jail after serving 60 days of his sentence. He then completed an outpatient drug treatment program at the Cedarwood Center in Hendersonville, Tennessee. As a recovering heroin addict, Earle has used his experience in his songwriting.

Earle's sister, Stacey Earle is also a musician and songwriter.

Political views and activism
Earle is outspoken with his political views, and often addresses them in his lyrics and in interviews. Politically he identifies as a socialist and tends to vote for Democratic candidates, despite not agreeing entirely with their politics. During the 2016 election he expressed support for Senator  Bernie Sanders, who he considered to have pushed Hillary Clinton to the left on important issues. In a 2017 interview Earle said about President Donald Trump: "We’ve never had an orangutan in the White House before. There's a lot of "What does this button do?" going on. It's scary. He really is a fascist. Whether he intended to be or not, he's a real live fascist." However, Earle has called for the American left to engage with the concerns of working class Trump voters, saying in 2017: "…maybe that's one of the things we need to examine from my side because we’re responsible. The left has lost touch with American people, and it's time to discuss that". In 2020, he stated: "I thought that, given the way things are now, it was maybe my responsibility to make a record that spoke to and for people who didn’t vote the way that I did. One of the dangers that we’re in is if people like me keep thinking that everyone who voted for Trump is a racist or an asshole, then we’re fucked, because it’s simply not true."

In his 1990 song "Justice in Ontario", Earle criticized the conviction of six Satan's Choice bikers for a 1978 murder in Port Hope, arguing that the accused were innocent, framed by the ruthless Corporal Terry Hall of the Ontario Provincial Police's Special Squad. In the song Earle compares the conviction of the "Port Hope 6" to the massacre of the Black Donnellys in 1880. In 1990, Earle stated in an interview about "Justice in Ontario": "There's some concern about reprisals because the O.P.P. (Ontario Provincial Police) is obviously not gonna be thrilled. My hope is that I’ll be far too out-in-the-open and far too public for the police to do anything and get away with it. But the point is, that's not a reason for doing or not doing anything, because…I very nearly went to prison myself for something I didn't do, simply because a law enforcement agency didn't want to admit that somebody had fucked up—they didn't want to open the whole can of worms and all the other complaints that were constantly brought against the Dallas police department. You can't stand by and let stuff like that go down without saying anything about it. And I think I especially have a responsibility to do that, ’cause if I didn't have any money right now I’d be in prison in Texas—I’m convinced of that. It was that close. But I was able to afford decent legal representation. And it comes down to the fact that people who can't afford decent legal representation—who are subject to something like this happening and turning out very badly—feed my kids. That's where my money comes from and that's where my freedom comes from".

Earle is a vocal opponent of capital punishment, which he considers his primary area of political activism. Several of his songs have provided descriptions of the experiences of death row inmates, including "Billy Austin" and "Over Yonder (Jonathan's Song)". Conversely, he has also written a song from the perspective of a prison guard working on death row in "Ellis Unit One", a song written for the film Dead Man Walking, the title based on the name of the State of Texas men's death row. He is pro-choice and has argued that rich Americans have always had access to abortions; he says the political issue in the US is really whether poor women should have access. His 2012 novel I'll Never Get Out of This World Alive describes the life of a morphine-addicted doctor in 1963 San Antonio before Roe v. Wade and who treats gunshot wounds while providing illegal abortions to poor women. Since his youngest son was diagnosed with autism, Earle has also become an advocate for people on the autism spectrum.

Discography

References

Further reading
 Schone, Mark. (1998). "Steve Earle". In The Encyclopedia of Country Music. Paul Kingsbury, Ed. New York: Oxford University Press. pp. 160–1.
 St John, Lauren. Hardcore Troubadour: The Life and Near Death of Steve Earle, Fourth Estate, 2002 
 McGee, David. Steve Earle, Fearless Heart, Outlaw Poet. Backbeat: San Francisco, 2005

External links

Steve Earle official website
Archive of articles about Earle
Guardian article written by Earle
CD reviews at Country Standard Time
Pitchfork review of the Townes album

1955 births
20th-century American guitarists
20th-century American male musicians
Activists from Texas
American abortion-rights activists
American anti-war activists
American anti–death penalty activists
American country guitarists
American country rock singers
American country singer-songwriters
American folk guitarists
American folk rock musicians
American male guitarists
American male singer-songwriters
American mandolinists
American rock guitarists
American socialists
Autism activists
Country musicians from Texas
Earle musical family
Fantasy Records artists
Geffen Records artists
Grammy Award winners
Guitarists from Texas
Living people
MCA Records artists
Musicians from Hampton, Virginia
Musicians from Houston
Musicians from San Antonio
New West Records artists
Progressivism in the United States
Rykodisc artists
Singer-songwriters from Texas
Singer-songwriters from Virginia
Stony Plain Records artists
Texas socialists
Uni Records artists